The 2018 Alabama Senate elections took place on November 3, 2018, as part of the 2018 United States elections. Alabama voters elected state senators in all 35 of the state's Senate districts. State senators serve four-year terms in the Alabama Senate.

A primary election on June 5, 2018, and a runoff election on July 17, 2018, determined which candidates appear on the November 6 general election ballot. Primary election results can be obtained from the Alabama Secretary of State's website.

Following the 2014 state Senate elections, Republicans maintained effective control of the House with a 27-seat majority—26 Republican members and 1 independent who caucuses with the Republicans. Democrats hold 8 seats following the 2014 elections.

To claim control of the chamber from Republicans, the Democrats would have needed to gain 10 Senate seats.

The election resulted in the Republican Party holding all previously held seats and taking a seat previously held by an independent who caucused with the Republicans, leading to no effective shift in control of the chamber. The Republicans also gained slightly in the popular vote compared to the 2014 elections.

Summary

Closest races

Results by district

Source:

District 1

District 2

District 3

District 4

District 5

District 6

District 7

District 8

District 9

District 10

District 11

District 12

District 13

District 14

District 15

District 16

District 17

District 18

District 19

District 20

District 21

District 22

District 23

District 24

District 25

District 26

District 27

District 28

District 29

District 30

District 31

District 32

District 33

District 34

District 35

See also
2018 United States elections
2018 United States House of Representatives elections in Alabama
2018 Alabama gubernatorial election
2018 Alabama lieutenant gubernatorial election
2018 Alabama Attorney General election
2018 Alabama State Treasurer election
2018 Alabama State Auditor election
2018 Alabama Commissioner of Agriculture and Industries election
2018 Alabama Public Service Commission election
2018 Alabama Secretary of State election
2018 Alabama House of Representatives election
2018 Alabama elections
Supreme Court of Alabama elections

References

Senate
2018
Alabama Senate